Seth Airam Vega Ramírez (born 1 July 1998), known as Seth Airam or simply Seth, is a Spanish footballer who plays as a forward.

Club career
Born in Las Palmas, Canary Islands, Airam joined Cádiz CF on 16 April 2017, after finishing his formation with ADM Lorquí. He made his senior debut with the reserves seven days later, coming on as a second-half substitute for David Toro in a 3–1 División de Honor away win against CD Rota.

Airam scored his first senior goals on 7 May 2017, netting a brace in a 4–1 away defeat of AD Cartaya. He made his first-team debut the following 21 January, replacing Álvaro García in a 0–1 away loss against AD Alcorcón in the Segunda División.

On 22 January 2020, after achieving two promotions with the B-team, Airam was loaned to Segunda División B side SD Ejea for six months. On 21 August, he moved to fellow league team Recreativo de Huelva also in a temporary deal.

On 13 August 2021, Airam moved to Segunda División RFEF side CF Villanovense on a one-year loan deal.

References

External links

Seth Airam profile at Cadistas1910 

1998 births
Living people
Footballers from Las Palmas
Spanish sportspeople of African descent
Spanish people of Ghanaian descent
Spanish footballers
Association football forwards
Segunda División players
Segunda División B players
Segunda Federación players
Tercera División players
Divisiones Regionales de Fútbol players
Cádiz CF B players
Cádiz CF players
SD Ejea players
Recreativo de Huelva players
CF Villanovense players